Shakespeare & Hathaway: Private Investigators is a British drama mystery television series set in Stratford-upon-Avon and produced by BBC Birmingham. The first series was broadcast in February 2018. A second series of ten episodes began broadcasting on 25 February 2019. A third series of ten episodes began broadcasting on 3 February 2020. A fourth series of ten episodes was filmed in 2021, with broadcast following in February 2022 on BBC One for the first nine, with the remaining one being saved for a Christmas special.

Plot
Ex-Detective Inspector (DI) Frank Hathaway, now a debt-laden private investigator, meets Luella Shakespeare when she employs him to investigate the fiancé she met online. Hathaway and his assistant Sebastian Brudenell discover that the fiancé is a con man. They report back to Luella, but she is reassured by her fiancé, and the wedding occurs. When her new husband is killed at the reception, Luella is suspected of murder by local Detective Inspector Christina Marlowe, who had been Frank's junior. Luella is thrown together with Frank and Sebastian to crack the mystery of what has happened, and after her name is cleared, she uses her recovered savings to buy into Frank's business. Frank's only employee is Sebastian Brudenell, a young aspiring RADA-trained actor who uses his skills when undercover investigations are required. He lives above a theatre costumier run by Gloria Fonteyn.

Cast
 Jo Joyner as Luella Shakespeare
 Mark Benton as Frank Hathaway
 Patrick Walshe McBride as Sebastian Brudenell
 Amber Aga as Detective Inspector Christina Marlowe (series 1–2)
 Tomos Eames as Detective Sergeant Joseph Keeler
 Roberta Taylor as Gloria Fonteyn
 Yasmin Kaur Barn as Police Constable Viola Deacon (series 3–4)

Episodes

Series overview

Series 1 (2018)

Series 2 (2019)

Series 3 (2020)

Series 4 (2022)

International broadcast
In Australia the first series began airing on ABC on 8 June 2018. The first series began airing on PBS in the US on 12 January 2019. In Italy, the series began airing on RAI 2 from 4 August 2019.
In Germany series 1 started 5 April 2019 on ZDFneo. Series 2 is running from 12 June 2020 onwards, again on ZDFneo. In the United States, the first three series have run and been rerun on various PBS stations, but the fourth series was exclusively released on BritBox streaming on 19 April 2022. Then it was aired on PBS stations later in 2022. The series has also began broadcasting in the Republic of Ireland via RTE One.

Home media

A Region B-locked Blu-ray of Series 1 was released in March 2019 and Series 2 was released on both DVD and Blu-ray in the UK in April 2019.

Reception
In a review of the first episode The Daily Telegraph called it "a nice, cosy drama" but found "plenty to dislike" about it, criticising in particular what it saw as an abundance of cliches, the character of Sebastian and the "crassness" of using the last names of William Shakespeare and his wife, Anne Hathaway, as the names of the detectives, and as the title of the series. The review stated, however, that daytime television, where the series airs in the UK, "is not really the place for complexity or grit". It also found that "the first episode of Shakespeare & Hathaway did at least set up two leading characters you’d want to see more of", and praised Benton and Joyner for their performances.

The Sunday Express found the programme "difficult to fault[...] well acted, nicely written – with decent jokes – and beautifully shot around Stratford".  It compared the show favourably with other, grittier fare on offer in television drama schedules.

Reviewing the first episode of the second series in 2019, i newspaper praised the "easy chemistry" of Joyner and Benton, as well as "a strong supporting cast [that] includes nice turns from Roberta Taylor and Patrick Walshe McBride in particular". Overall, it says, "this is drama with the ham in the oven and turned up to ten. And yet somehow, it actually works". Paying special attention to the writing of creators Jude Tindall and Paul Matthew Thompson, it goes on to say that "the real appeal of this show lies in a gentle if arch charm, decent plots and a sense that if we're going to spend time in territory adjacent to Midsomer Murders, then you might as well have fun with it".

References

External links
 
 
 

2018 British television series debuts
2010s British crime drama television series
2010s British mystery television series
2010s British workplace drama television series
2020s British crime drama television series
2020s British mystery television series
2020s British workplace drama television series
BBC crime drama television shows
BBC high definition shows
BBC mystery television shows
British detective television series
BBC Daytime television series
English-language television shows
Murder in television
Stratford-upon-Avon
Television shows set in Warwickshire
Television series by BBC Studios